Laranjeiras Esporte Clube, commonly known as Laranjeiras, is a Brazilian football club based in Laranjeiras, Sergipe state.

History
The club was founded on February 22, 2008. Laranjeiras reached the semifinal stage of the Campeonato Sergipano Série A2 in 2009, when they were eliminated by Riachuelo.

Stadium
Laranjeiras Esporte Clube play their home games at Estádio Aníbal Franco. The stadium has a maximum capacity of 3,000 people.

References

Association football clubs established in 2008
Football clubs in Sergipe
2008 establishments in Brazil